Waitōtara is a town in South Taranaki, New Zealand. Waverley is 10 km to the north-west, and Whanganui is 34 km to the south-east. State Highway 3 passes through it. The Waitōtara River flows past the east side of the town.

More than 30 homes were evacuated during flooding in February 2004.

A local freezing works is a major employer.

Demographics

There were 42 males and 30 females, giving a sex ratio of 1.4 males per female. Ethnicities were 51 people  (70.8%) European/Pākehā and 24 (33.3%) Māori (totals add to more than 100% since people could identify with multiple ethnicities). Of the total population, 12 people  (16.7%) were under 15 years old, 6 (8.3%) were 15–29, 33 (45.8%) were 30–64, and 21 (29.2%) were over 65.

Marae

Waitōtara has marae associated with the hapū of Ngā Rauru Kītahi:
 Te Ihupuku Marae and Te Kawerau and Karepoonia are affiliated with Ngāti Hinewaiata.
 Kaipō or Wharetapapa Marae and its Tokanuhea III meeting house are affiliated with Ngāti Hou Tipua.
 Takirau Marae and Ko Te Marunga Nui o Pourua meeting house are affiliated with Ngāti Pourua.
 Tauranga Ika Marae and Te Aputa ki Wairau meeting house are affiliated with Ngāti Ruaiti.
 Waipapa Marae and Ngā Paiaka meeting house are affiliated with Ngā Ariki.

In October 2020, the Government committed $522,926 from the Provincial Growth Fund to upgrade Te Ihupuku Marae, Waipapa Marae and Te Aroha Marae, creating 92 jobs.

Education
Waitotara School is a coeducational full primary (years 1–8) school with a roll of  students as of  The school was founded in 1874.

See also
Pehimana
Waitotara (New Zealand electorate)

References

South Taranaki District
Populated places in Taranaki